is a 1987 action game by Konami for the Family Computer Disk System. It was only released in Japan.

External links
 Game info from Atari HQ
 

Konami games
1987 video games
Famicom Disk System games
Famicom Disk System-only games
Japan-exclusive video games
Video games based on Hindu mythology
Video games scored by Kiyohiro Sada
Video games set in India
Video games developed in Japan